The 1974 Barnett Bank Masters was a women's singles tennis tournament played on outdoor green clay courts at the Bartlett Park Tennis Center in St. Petersburg, Florida in the United States. The event was part of the 1974 Virginia Slims Series. It was the fourth edition of the tournament and was held from April 15 through April 21, 1974. First-seeded Chris Evert won the singles title and earned $9,000 first-prize money.

Finals

Singles
 Chris Evert defeated  Kerry Melville 6–0, 6–1
 It was Evert's 5th singles title of the year and the 28th of her career.

Doubles
 Olga Morozova /  Betty Stöve defeated  Chris Evert /  Evonne Goolagong 6–4, 6–2

Prize money

References

Barnett Bank Masters
Eckerd Open
Barnett Bank Masters
Barnett Bank Masters
Barnett Bank Masters